Özgür Mumcu (born 1977) is a Turkish writer and journalist. He works for the Cumhuriyet newspaper. His debut novel The Peace Machine was translated into English and was nominated for the EBRD Literature Prize.

References

Turkish writers
Turkish journalists
1977 births
Date of birth missing (living people)
Living people
Place of birth missing (living people)